The Roxy Theater is a former movie theater located at 1527 Washington Avenue in Miami Beach, Florida.  In 1994, the Roxy was converted into an adult nightclub and renamed Club Madonna.  It is owned and operated by theater and nightclub proprietor and former Broadway theater producer Leroy Griffith.

History

The Roxy, billed as "Miami Beach's newest and most fabulous theatre," opened on Friday, July 21, 1967.  For its grand opening, the theater premiered The Way West, starring Kirk Douglas, Robert Mitchum, and Richard Widmark.

"The theater is luxurious, designed for comfort and seats 400," wrote Miami News columnist Herb Kelly.  He also reported that Griffith planned to add vaudeville later.

Griffith generated publicity there when, in 1967, he publicly invited city officials to a screening of the film, Man and Wife.  "It was advertised as the art of making love 49 different ways," he said in a 1993 interview.  "I don't remember inviting them, but I vaguely remember the incident.  I think that was the first hard-core movie ever shown down here."  According to press accounts at the time, the officials seemed to think the movie was boring, but not obscene.

In early 1994, Griffith converted the Roxy from an adult movie theater to an all-nude strip club (Club Madonna), which it remains today.  He successfully withstood an attempt by attorneys for the pop singer Madonna to prevent him from using the name.

References

External links
 Club Madonna

Roxy Theater
Buildings and structures in Miami Beach, Florida
1967 establishments in Florida
Theatres completed in 1967